A list of notable flat horse races which take place annually in Great Britain, under the authority of the British Horseracing Authority (BHA), including all conditions races which currently hold Group 1, 2 or 3 status in the European Pattern.

Race distances
The distances of the races are expressed in miles, furlongs and yards. In 2017 the BHA concluded a racecourse survey and remeasurement which led to some racecourses changing the exact distance of some races, or moving race start points to fit with advertised race distances. The distances in the table below are exact distances. Race distances are often given to the nearest furlong: e.g. The Derby's exact distance is 1 mile 4 furlongs and 6 yards, but it is called a 1 mile 4 furlong race.

Group 1

Group 2

Group 3

Listed

Handicaps

Other races

Discontinued

Historic races

References

 British Flat Pattern and Listed races 2018

Flat races
British flat races
Horse races, flat